The 12411 / 12412 Chandigarh–Amritsar Intercity Express is a Superfast Express train belonging to Indian Railways – Northern Railway zone that runs between  and  in India.

It operates as train number 12411 from Chandigarh to Amritsar Junction and as train number 12412 in the reverse direction, serving the Union Territory of Chandigarh & the state of Punjab.

Coaches

The 12411 / 12 Chandigarh–Amritsar Intercity Express has 1 AC Chair Car, 8 Second Class seating, 2 General Unreserved & 2 SLR (Seating cum Luggage Rake) coaches. It does not carry a pantry car.

As is customary with most train services in India, coach composition may be amended at the discretion of Indian Railways depending on demand.

Service

The 12411 Chandigarh–Amritsar Intercity Express covers the distance of 248 kilometres in 4 hours 30 mins (55.11 km/hr) & in 4 hours 25 mins as 12412 Amritsar–Chandigarh Intercity Express (56.15 km/hr).

As the average speed of the train is above , as per Indian Railways rules, its fare includes a Superfast surcharge.

Routeing

Traction

As the entire route is fully electrified, a Ghaziabad-based WAP-5 / WAP-7 powers the train for its entire journey.

Timings

12411 Chandigarh–Amritsar Intercity Express leaves Chandigarh on a daily basis at 06:55 hrs IST and reaches Amritsar Junction at 11:25 hrs IST the same day.
12412 Amritsar–Chandigarh Intercity Express leaves Amritsar Junction on a daily basis at 17:30 hrs IST and reaches Chandigarh at 21:55 hrs IST the same day.

References 

 https://www.youtube.com/watch?v=p1qIgdKqjwg
 http://www.railnews.co.in/new-intercity-superfast-express-from-chandigarh-to-amritsar-a-hit-among-regulars/
 http://www.railnews.co.in/chandigarh-amritsar-intercity-express-to-have-one-minute-stoppage-at-phagwara-jn/
 http://www.dailypioneer.com/state-editions/chandigarh/patil-flags-off-chandigarh-amritsar-intercity-super-fast-express.html
 http://www.tribuneindia.com/2013/20131116/ldh1.htm
 http://www.nr.indianrailways.gov.in/view_detail.jsp?lang=0&dcd=3437&id=0,4,268

External links

Transport in Amritsar
Rail transport in Chandigarh
Rail transport in Punjab, India
Intercity Express (Indian Railways) trains
Railway services introduced in 2011